Rebellion Is Over is a split EP by Genesis Breyer P-Orridge, Black Rain and Cold Cave, released on October 15, 2015, by Dais Records.

Track listing

Personnel 
Adapted from the Rebellion Is Over liner notes.

Musicians
 Stuart Argabright (as Black Rain) – instruments (A2)
 Wesley Eisold (as Cold Cave) – instruments (B)
 Genesis Breyer P-Orridge – instruments (A1)

Release history

References

External links 
 
 Rebellion Is Over at iTunes

2015 EPs
Black Rain (band) albums
Cold Cave albums